The men's aerials event in freestyle skiing at the 1998 Winter Olympics in Nagano took place from 16 to 18 February at Iizuna Kogen Ski Area.

Results

Qualification
The top 12 advanced to the final.

Final

References

External links
Sports-Reference - 1998 Men's aerials

Men's freestyle skiing at the 1998 Winter Olympics